Gabriela Bertante is a Brazilian former model and actress who appears in Indian films. She is famous for her works in 2012 film Billa II, 2012 film Devudu Chesina Manushulu, 2012 film Cameraman Gangatho Rambabu and 2014 film Balwinder Singh Famous Ho Gaya.

Early life
Gabriela Bertante notes that as a teenager aged 17, she used to help her parents at their store in her hometown in Matias Barbosa, Minas Gerais, Brazil before she moved to São Paulo to begin a career in modelling. Bertante also took her football seriously and played in regional soccer leagues, while her brother Glelberson Luís Leopoldino Bertante has played football professionally for several Brazilian teams including Palmeiras. She moved to India in 2010 and took part in the Lakme Fashion Week and was featured in several magazines which caught the attention of MTV who cast her as a VJ in MTV Grind.

Career
Gabriela had a meeting with Puri Jagannadh in Mumbai and the director suggested that she should do a test shoot, so she went to Hyderabad to meet him, and subsequently received an offer to dance for an item number in Devudu Chesina Manushulu alongside Ravi Teja. She shot for the song in Bangkok, Thailand. The actress was seen in Chakri Toleti's Tamil film Billa II alongside leading actor Ajith Kumar. She had met director Chakri Toleti, when he was casting for an earlier movie and he promised her this role. The song, which has been composed by Yuvan Shankar Raja, was picturised in Goa and a studio in Mumbai. She debuted in Bollywood with the movie "Balwinder Singh Famous Ho Gaya" alongside the actors Mika Singh and Shaan. This movie released on 19 September 2014.

Filmography

References

External links
 
 
 

Living people
People from Minas Gerais
Brazilian film actresses
Brazilian female models
Brazilian expatriate actresses in India
Actresses in Hindi cinema
Actresses in Tamil cinema
Actresses in Telugu cinema
21st-century Brazilian actresses
Year of birth missing (living people)